Yona  is a rural locality (a selo) in Kovdorsky District of Murmansk Oblast, Russia, located beyond the Arctic Circle at a height of  above sea level. Population: 314 (2010 Census).

History
It was first mentioned as the pogost of Yono-Babinsky in 1574. According to other sources, it was established by Finns and Sami in 1840.

References

Notes

Sources

Rural localities in Murmansk Oblast

